Williams Junction was an Amtrak train station on the Southwest Chief route, located  southeast of Williams, Arizona in the Kaibab National Forest. The station primarily served passengers travelling to the Grand Canyon via the Grand Canyon Railway.

History

The first station at Williams Junction was built by Morrison-Knudsen for the Atchison, Topeka & Santa Fe Railway as part of construction of the Crookton Cutoff: a new  stretch of the Southern Transcon built to avoid the sharp curves and steep gradients of the existing line between Williams and Ash Fork. With the new route bypassing the town of Williams completely, Williams Junction replaced the downtown Williams Depot as the connection point between main line transcontinental services and Santa Fe trains to and from the Grand Canyon (trains 14 and 15). The station officially opened on December 18, 1960. Williams Depot remained open for the Hassayampa Flyer service between Williams Junction and Phoenix via Ash Fork and the Peavine route (trains 42 and 47). Both Williams stations closed on April 30, 1969 following the Santa Fe's discontinuation of passenger services to the Grand Canyon and Phoenix via the Peavine. The station building at Williams Junction remained standing for a few years following its closure, but was eventually demolished. The spur from the Southern Transcon and the line through downtown Williams were retained for freight services.

Following the successful regeneration of the former Santa Fe line to the Grand Canyon as a privately operated tourist venture in 1989, Amtrak introduced a stop at Williams Junction on their Southwest Chief route to connect with Grand Canyon Railway services. The new station opened on August 2, 1999. Unlike its predecessor, the modern Williams Junction had no station building or facilities, and no private access for motor vehicles. Passengers were transferred to downtown Williams via a Thruway Motorcoach shuttle provided by the Grand Canyon Railway. The collection and drop-off point was the Grand Canyon Railway Hotel adjacent to the refurbished Williams Depot, now the southern terminus of the Grand Canyon line.

Closure

In 2017, the Grand Canyon Railway announced they would be discontinuing their provision of a shuttle to connect passengers on the Southwest Chief with their hotel in Williams, leaving the long-term viability of Williams Junction unclear. The station closed on January 1, 2018. To accommodate passengers requiring a connection to the Grand Canyon, Amtrak introduced a new Thruway bus service to and from Flagstaff.

References

Buildings and structures in Coconino County, Arizona
Transportation in Coconino County, Arizona
Williams, Arizona
Atchison, Topeka and Santa Fe Railway stations in Arizona
Railway stations in the United States opened in 1960
Former Amtrak stations in Arizona
Railway stations closed in 2018
1960 establishments in New Mexico